Ralph G. Martin (March 4, 1920 – January 9, 2013) was an American journalist who authored or co-authored about thirty books, including popular biographies of recent historical figures, among which, Jennie, a two-volume (1969 and 1971) study of Winston Churchill's American mother, Lady Randolph Churchill, became the most prominent bestseller. Other successful tomes focused on British royal romance (Edward VIII and Wallis Simpson in 1974, as well as Prince Charles and Lady Diana in 1985) and on the Kennedy family (John F. Kennedy in 1983 and Joseph P. Kennedy in 1995).

Early life and education 
Born in Chicago, Ralph Martin Goldberg was eight years old when his family moved to Brooklyn, and started using the name Ralph G. Martin at an early age. He studied at City College of New York before earning a bachelor's degree in journalism from the University of Missouri in 1941.

Career 
Twenty-one years old upon receiving his diploma, he decided to hitchhike and found a newspaper job at Box Elder News Journal which served Brigham City, the county seat of Utah's Box Elder County. In December, following declaration of war in the aftermath of attack on Pearl Harbor, Martin enlisted in the Army and spent the war as a combat correspondent for the Armed Forces newspaper Stars and Stripes and the Army weekly magazine, Yank. In 1944, having interviewed New York City's mayor, Fiorello La Guardia, for Yank, Martin asked La Guardia to perform his marriage ceremony to Marjorie Pastel.

Returning to civilian life in 1945, Martin began working as editor for news and analysis publications Newsweek and The New Republic and became executive editor at decorating and domestic arts magazine House Beautiful. During the months preceding the 1952 and 1956 presidential elections, he served as a member of the campaign staff for the Democratic nominee, Adlai Stevenson.

Upon publication of Seeds of Destruction: Joe Kennedy and His Sons, he was invited for an hour-long conversation with Charlie Rose, broadcast December 8, 1995 on Rose's long-running TV interview program. A clip from the conversation was included on Rose's year-end show in memoriam of 35 guests on his programs, between 1991 and 2009, who died in 2013.

Personal life 
Having lived for years in the Connecticut town of Westport, near New York City, Martin moved to the Kendal-on-Hudson retirement community in Sleepy Hollow, New York, where he died seven-and-a-half weeks before his 93rd birthday. He and his wife Marjorie had three children.

Selected bibliography

References

External links

Ralph G. Martin at New York State Literary Tree
Ralph G. Martin interviewed by Connie Martinson (on her TV program Connie Martinson Talks Books) upon publication of Charles & Diana, his 1985 book detailing the royal romance

1920 births
2013 deaths
20th-century American biographers
20th-century American historians
American male non-fiction writers
American political writers
American male journalists
University of Missouri alumni
Historians of the United States
Writers from Chicago
People from Westport, Connecticut
Writers from New York (state)
21st-century American biographers
20th-century American male writers
Historians from Illinois
American male biographers
United States Army personnel of World War II